Snow Peak is a  mountain summit in the Spray Mountains, a sub-range of the Canadian Rockies in Alberta, Canada. The mountain is situated on the shared border of Peter Lougheed Provincial Park with Banff National Park. The nearest higher peak is Mount Birdwood,  to the northeast. The mountain is primarily used for hiking.

Geology

Snow Peak is composed of sedimentary rock laid down during the Precambrian to Jurassic periods. Formed in shallow seas, this sedimentary rock was pushed east and over the top of younger rock during the Laramide orogeny.

Climate

Based on the Köppen climate classification, Snow Peak is located in a subarctic climate with cold, snowy winters, and mild summers. Winter temperatures can drop below −20 °C with wind chill factors below −30 °C.

References

External link
 Summitpost.org

Mountains of Banff National Park
Snow Peak